Pervokamenka is a rural locality (a selo) and the administrative center of Pervokamensky Selsoviet of Tretyakovsky District, Altai Krai, Russia. The population was 575 in 2016. There are  15 streets.

Geography 
Pervokamenka is located 27 km east of Staroaleyskoye (the district's administrative centre) by road. Shipunikha is the nearest rural locality.

References 

Rural localities in Tretyakovsky District